Ebenezer Mattoon Chamberlain (August 20, 1805 – March 14, 1861) was an American lawyer and politician who served one term as a U.S. Representative from Indiana 1853 to 1855.

Early life and career 
Born in Orrington, Maine, Chamberlain attended public school before becoming employed in his father's shipyard. Later, he studied law and moved to Connersville, where he completed his studies, gaining admission to the bar in 1832 and commencing practice in Elkhart County in 1833.

He served as member of the Indiana House of Representatives from 1835 to 1837, before serving in the state Senate from 1839 to 1842.

Chamberlain was elected prosecuting attorney of the ninth judicial circuit in 1842 and became elected president judge of the ninth judicial district in 1843. He was reelected in 1851 and served until he resigned when he was elected to Congress. He served as a delegate to the Democratic National Convention in 1844.

Congress 
Chamberlain was elected as a Democrat to the Thirty-third Congress from March 4, 1853 to March 3, 1855). Afterwards, he practiced of law in Goshen, until his death.

Death
He died in Goshen on March 14, 1861, and was interred in Oak Ridge Cemetery.

References

1805 births
1861 deaths
People from Orrington, Maine
American Swedenborgians
Democratic Party members of the United States House of Representatives from Indiana
People from Connersville, Indiana
People from Elkhart County, Indiana
19th-century American politicians